The West Coast Conference (WCC) — known as the California Basketball Association from 1952 to 1956 and then as the West Coast Athletic Conference until 1989 — is a collegiate athletic conference affiliated with NCAA Division I consisting of ten member schools across the states of California, Oregon, Utah, and Washington.

All of the current members are private, faith-based institutions. Seven members are Catholic Church affiliates, with four of these schools being Jesuit institutions. Pepperdine is an affiliate of the Churches of Christ. Brigham Young University is an affiliate of the Church of Jesus Christ of Latter-day Saints. The conference's newest member, the University of the Pacific (which rejoined in 2013 after a 42-year absence), is affiliated with the United Methodist Church, although it has been financially independent of the church since 1969.

History

The league was chartered by five northern California institutions, four from the San Francisco Bay Area (San Francisco, Saint Mary's, Santa Clara, San Jose State) and one, Pacific, from Stockton. It began as the California Basketball Association, playing its first game on January 2, 1953. After two seasons under that name, the conference expanded to include Los Angeles-area schools Loyola (now Loyola Marymount) and Pepperdine in 1955 and became the "West Coast Athletic Conference" in 1956. After more than three decades as the WCAC, the name was shortened in the summer of 1989, dropping the word "Athletic."

During the massive upheaval of conference affiliations in the 1990s, the WCC remained very stable. Before the 2010 realignment that eventually led to Brigham Young joining the conference, the last change of membership was in 1980, when Seattle University left the conference. At the time, only the Ivy League and Pacific-10 Conference (now the Pac-12 Conference) had remained unchanged for a longer period.

The WCC participates at the NCAA Division I level and is considered to be a mid-major athletic conference. The conference sponsors 15 sports but does not include football as one of them. San Diego (Pioneer Football League) and Brigham Young (FBS independent) are the only schools fielding a football team. The rest have all dropped the sport, some as early as the 1940s, before the conference existed (Gonzaga and Portland), and one as late as 2003 (Saint Mary's).

Historically, the WCC's strongest sports have been soccer (nine national champions, including back-to-back women's soccer titles in 2001 and 2002) and tennis (five individual champions and one team champion). The conference has also made its presence felt nationally in men's basketball. San Francisco won two consecutive national titles in the 1950s with all-time great Bill Russell.  Although the WCAC's stature declined in the 1960s, San Francisco was reckoned as a "major" basketball power until the early 1980s. Also of note was Loyola Marymount's inspired run to the Elite Eight in 1990 following the death of Hank Gathers during that season's WCC championship tournament.

More recently, Gonzaga's rise to national prominence after being invited to the NCAA Tournament every year since their Cinderella run to the "Elite Eight" in 1999 has helped make the WCC a household name. As San Francisco was from the 1940s to the early 1980s, Gonzaga has gained recognition as a major basketball power, despite the WCC being a mid-major conference. Gonzaga has been to 23 consecutive NCAA tournaments—the longest streak for any school in the Western United States, the third-longest active streak, and the sixth-longest streak in history. They have also been to all but one WCC tournament final since 1995, and have played for the conference title every year since 1998. In 2016–17, the Bulldogs advanced all the way to the national championship game—the deepest run by a WC(A)C team since San Francisco went to three consecutive Final Fours from 1955 to 1957. The Bulldogs reached the title game again in 2021, this time entering the game unbeaten, but again losing, this time to Baylor.

Saint Mary's has also made marks for the conference as the Gaels appeared in the NCAA Tournament in 2005, 2008, 2010, 2012, 2013, 2017, 2019, and 2021 (making the "Sweet Sixteen" in 2010).

Eventually, with the 2010 realignment opening up new avenues for expansion, the WCC decided to revisit expansion plans. The conference decided that it would only seek out private schools, but would not limit its search to faith-based institutions. Even so, the two additions, Brigham Young University and University of the Pacific are both faith-based institutions, although Pacific has not been financially sponsored by the United Methodist Church since 1969.

On August 31, 2010, BYU announced plans to join the WCC for the 2011–12 season in all sports the conference offers. BYU joined the conference on July 1, 2011. BYU's arrival gave the WCC another school with a rich basketball tradition. The Cougars made the NCAA Tournament six straight times before failing to do so in 2013, and had made 26 NCAA Tournament appearances before joining the conference.

On March 27, 2012, the University of the Pacific (UOP), a charter member of the conference in 1952, accepted an invitation to rejoin the WCC, effective July 1, 2013. The move removed Pacific from the Big West Conference back to the WCC, which Pacific left in 1971 in order to pursue its interests in football that it later abandoned in 1995.

The WCC became the first Division I conference to adopt a conference-wide diversity hiring commitment, announcing the "Russell Rule", based on the NFL's Rooney Rule and named after Basketball Hall of Famer and social activist Bill Russell, a graduate of charter and current conference member San Francisco, on August 2, 2020. In its announcement, the WCC stated:

The WCC announced on July 19, 2022 that it would add men's water polo starting in 2023–24. Full members Loyola Marymount, Pacific, Pepperdine, and Santa Clara will be joined by affiliates Air Force, California Baptist, and San Jose State.

Member schools

Current members
Departing members are highlighted in red. BYU will join the Big 12 Conference in 2023.

Notes

Associate member

Future associate members

Former members

Former associate members

Notes

Membership timeline

  

 Due to space limitations, the following affiliations are not linked within the timeline:
 Fresno State had dual membership with the California Collegiate Athletic Association during their tenure in the WCAC before committing full-time with the CCAA from 1957 to 1969:
 UC Santa Barbara joined what was then the PCAA in 1969. It left in 1974 to become independent and returned in 1976.
 Seattle was a member of the Northwest Conference, then affiliated with the NAIA, from 1997 to 1999. The school then returned to the NCAA as a Division II institution and played as an independent until 2001.

Sports 

The West Coast Conference sponsors championship competition in six men's and nine women's NCAA sanctioned sports, with the newest addition being softball in 2013–14.

Men's sports
Departing members are highlighted in red.

Women's sports
Departing members are highlighted in red.

Facilities

Notable sports figures 
Some of the famous athletes who played collegiately for WCC schools and coaches and executives that attended WCC schools, include:
Basketball: 
Mahershala Ali, two-time Academy Award-winning actor who played basketball at Saint Mary's under his birth name of Mahershalalhashbaz Gilmore
David Cooke, former NBA player (St. Mary's)
Dan Dickau, former NBA player (2002-2008) (Gonzaga)
Brandon Davies, former NBA player who currently plays in the Liga ACB. During his sophomore year, he helped BYU rise as high as #3 in the national polls before being suspended for an honor code violation. He was reinstated for his junior and senior seasons and named to the All West Coast Conference team. (2009-2013) (BYU)
Rick Adelman, former NBA head coach (Loyola Marymount)
Dennis Awtrey, former NBA player (1970-1982) (Santa Clara)
Bernie Bickerstaff, former NBA head coach (San Diego)
Mike Brown, former NBA head coach (San Diego)
Ricardo Brown, former NBA player, one of the Philippine Basketball Association's 25 Greatest Players
Bill Cartwright, former NBA player and head coach, former NBA All-Star (San Francisco)
Doug Christie, former NBA player (1993–2007) selected 17th overall in the 1992 NBA Draft by the Seattle SuperSonics (Pepperdine)
Darwin Cook, former NBA player (1980-1989) (Portland)
Richie Frahm, former NBA player (2003-2008) (Gonzaga)
Maggie Dixon, former women's head coach at Army (San Diego)
Mike Champion, former NBA player (1988-1989) (Gonzaga)
Hank Gathers, college player who led the nation in scoring and rebounding in 1990 before collapsing and dying during the WCC tournament (Loyola Marymount)
Bruce Hale, former NBA player (1948–51) (Santa Clara)
Elias Harris, current Germany international (Gonzaga)
Dennis Johnson, Basketball Hall of Famer, former NBA player (1976-1990) 1979 NBA Finals MVP and 5-Time NBA All-Star. Coached the LA Clippers for one season (2003) (Pepperdine)
K. C. Jones, former NBA player (1958-1967), and Basketball Hall of Famer (San Francisco)
Bo Kimble, former NBA player (1990-1993) (Loyola Marymount)
Harold Keeling, former NBA player, (1986), (Santa Clara)
Tom Meschery, former NBA player (1961-1971), and NBA All-Star (1963) (Saint Mary's)
Patrick Mills, current Australia international with the San Antonio Spurs (Saint Mary's)
Adam Morrison, former NBA player known for being the 3rd overall pick in the 2006 NBA Draft by the Charlotte Bobcats and the 2005-06 National College Co-Player of the Year (Gonzaga)
Austin Daye, current NBA player with the Detroit Pistons. Selected with the 15th pick of the 2009 NBA Draft (Gonzaga)
Eric Musselman, former NBA head coach (San Diego)
Steve Nash, Basketball Hall of Famer, former NBA player (1996-2014) and 2005 and 2006 NBA MVP (Santa Clara)
Dick O'Keefe, inaugural season NBA player, (1947–51) (Santa Clara)
Bud Ogden, former NBA player, (1969-1971) (Santa Clara)
Michael Olowokandi, former NBA player (Pacific)
Kelly Olynyk, current Canada men's international with the Miami Heat (Gonzaga)
Filip Petrušev, NBA draft 2021, Philadelphia 76ers; currently plays for Crvena zvezda of the Adriatic League and EuroLeague (Gonzaga)
Kurt Rambis, former NBA player (1981-1995) and NBA head coach (1999 and 2009-2011) (Santa Clara)
Bill Russell, Basketball Hall of Fame Player (12-Time All-Star, 5-Time NBA MVP, and 11-Time NBA Champion) and coach, 1956 College Player of the Year (San Francisco)
Robert Sacre, current NBA player with the Los Angeles Lakers, and current Canada international (Gonzaga)
Omar Samhan, currently playing in Lithuania and the Euroleague with Žalgiris (Saint Mary's)
Ken Sears, former NBA Player (1955–64), First basketball player on a Sports Illustrated cover. (Santa Clara)
Jose Slaughter, former NBA player (1982-1983) (Portland)
Erik Spoelstra, current head coach of the Miami Heat (Portland)
Jeremy Pargo, current NBA player with the Cleveland Cavaliers (Gonzaga)
John Stockton, Basketball Hall of Famer (10-Time All-Star, and All-Time NBA Leader in Assists and Steals) (Gonzaga)
Stew Morrill, former college head coach Utah State (Gonzaga)
Ronny Turiaf, current Los Angeles Clippers player (Gonzaga)
Courtney Vandersloot, current WNBA player with the Chicago Sky (Gonzaga)
Nick Vanos, former NBA player, (1985–87) (Santa Clara)
Matthew Dellavedova, current NBA player with the Milwaukee Bucks (Saint Mary's)
Soccer:
Conor Casey, 2010 MLS Cup MVP, 2009 MLS Best XI, and former United States men's national soccer team forward (Portland)
Brandi Chastain, member of the USA national team that won the 1999 Women's World Cup (Santa Clara)
Steve Cherundolo, Hannover 96 captain and three-time World Cup veteran (2002, 2006, 2010) with the United States men's national soccer team (Portland)
Brian Ching, USA men's national team player (Gonzaga)
John Doyle, general manager of the San Jose Earthquakes, former USA men's national team player (San Francisco)
Kasey Keller, former US international goalkeeper and four-time World Cup (1994, 1998, 2002, 2006) veteran (Portland)
Shannon MacMillan, member of the 1999 Women's World Cup winners (Portland)
Tiffeny Milbrett, member of the 1999 Women's World Cup winners (Portland)
Christine Sinclair, two-time Hermann Trophy winner and all-time leading goal scorer for the Canadian women's national team (Portland)
Aly Wagner, 2002 Hermann Trophy winner and member of the US women's soccer team that won gold at the 2004 Olympics (Santa Clara)
Baseball:
Jon Moscot, major league baseball pitcher (Cincinnati Reds)
Jason Bay, 2004 National League Rookie of the Year and three-time All-Star (Gonzaga)
Vance Law, former MLB player, and 1-time MLB All-Star (1988). Former BYU Baseball Coach (2000-2012). Son of MLB Pitcher Vern Law. (BYU)
Randy Winn, former MLB outfielder and 2002 All-Star (Santa Clara)
Dan Haren, 2007 American League All-Star Game starting pitcher, currently with the Washington Nationals (Pepperdine)
Noah Lowry, major-league pitcher (currently a free agent) and former college roommate of Dan Haren (Pepperdine)
Mike Redmond, former MLB catcher and current manager of the Florida Marlins (Gonzaga)
Mark Teahen, former MLB player (Saint Mary's)
Tom Candiotti, former MLB pitcher (Saint Mary's)
Mike Scott, former major-league pitcher (Pepperdine)
Randy Wolf, former MLB pitcher (Pepperdine)
Brian Matusz, pitcher with the Baltimore Orioles (San Diego)
CJ Wilson, pitcher with the Los Angeles Angels of Anaheim (Loyola Marymount)
Theo Epstein, President of the Chicago Cubs and former general manager of the Boston Red Sox (San Diego – School of Law only; earned bachelor's degree at Yale)
Kris Bryant, Chicago Cubs 3rd baseman, 2013 2nd overall draft pick, 2015 National League Rookie of the Year, and 2016 NL MVP leading the Cubs to the 2016 World Series Championship (San Diego)
Bill Bavasi, MLB executive (San Diego)
Ken Dayley, former major league pitcher, 1980 1st round draft pick, 3rd overall, pitched in both the '85 and '87 World Series for the St. Louis Cardinals (Portland)
Bill Krueger, former major league pitcher (Portland)
Pat Casey, current Oregon State baseball head coach, his team winning both the 2006 and 2007 College World Series (Portland)
Von Hayes, former major league outfielder/first baseman (Saint Mary's)
Water polo:
Terry Schroeder, former NCAA player, two-time Olympic silver medal winner (1984 and 1988), and Head Coach of silver medal winning men's water polo team at the 2008 Summer Olympics (Pepperdine)
Merrill Moses, silver medal winner at the 2008 Summer Olympics (Pepperdine)
Jesse Smith, silver medal winner at the 2008 Summer Olympics (Pepperdine)
Volleyball:
Mike Whitmarsh — Winner of 28 AVP beach volleyball events, as well as a silver medal in the sport at the 1996 Summer Olympics (San Diego – volleyball and basketball; however, men's volleyball is not a WCC sport)
Taylor Sander - Member of the American US Indoor Volleyball team and a player for Blu Volleyball Verona. Led US national team to an upset of Brazil to win the FIVB World League 2014. Was named best outside spiker and tournament MVP. He holds the BYU all-time single-match record for service aces (nine) and career service aces (182). In the rally-scoring era ranks No. 1 at BYU in career kills (1,743), career attempts (3,464), career service aces (182), season attempts (1,021 in 2014), season service aces (55 in 2014) and aces in a match (nine). (BYU - volleyball; however Men's Indoor volleyball isn't a WCC sport)
Football
Hust Stockton - Back; Frankford Yellow Jackets (NFL) (1925–1928). Member of the Yellow Jackets' 1926 NFL Championship team. (Gonzaga)
Ray Flaherty - End; Los Angeles Wildcats (1926), New York Yankees (–), New York Giants (–, –), No. 1 retired.  Head Coach; Gonzaga Bulldogs (1930), Boston/Washington Redskins (–), New York Yankees (1946–1948), Chicago Hornets (1949).  Three time NFL champion (1934, 1937, 1942). Pro Football Hall of Fame (1976).  (Gonzaga)
Tony Canadeo - Halfback; Green Bay Packers (1941–1944, 1946–1952). Pro Football Hall of Fame (1974), Green Bay Packers Hall of Fame, No. 3 retired.  (Gonzaga)
Pete Carroll, current coach of the Seattle Seahawks of the NFL, former head coach of USC trojans of the NCAA. Led Seattle to Super Bowl XLVIII, where they defeated the Denver Broncos. Led the USC Trojans to 6 BCS Bowl victories. (Pacific) 
Ted Leland, a first team PCAA selection as a defensive end in 1969. Current athletic director at Pacific. Served as athletic director at Stanford University for 12 years, leading them to the NACDA Directors' Cup from 1995 to 2005.  (Pacific '70 and 72')
John Fassel, special teams coordinator for the St. Louis Rams of the NFL. (Pacific, transferred when program was ended in 1995)
Hue Jackson, former head coach of the Cleveland Browns, former offensive coordinator for the Cincinnati Bengals, former head coach of the Oakland Raiders. (Pacific)

See also
West Coast Conference Men's Basketball Tournament
West Coast Conference Women's Basketball Tournament
West Coast Conference Baseball Championship

References

External links

 

 
Organizations based in California
West Coast of the United States
Sports in the Western United States
Sports organizations established in 1952
Articles which contain graphical timelines
1952 establishments in California